Warur/Varur is a village in the southern state of Karnataka, India.It is located in the Hubli taluk of Dharwad district in Karnataka.

Demographics
As of the 2011 Census of India there were 644 households in Warur and a total population of 3,265 consisting of 1,845 males and 1,420 females. There were 407 children ages 0-6.

See also
 Dharwad
 Districts of Karnataka

References

External links
 http://Dharwad.nic.in/

Villages in Dharwad district